Hira Singh Bisht is an Indian politician from Uttarakhand and a three term Member of the Uttarakhand Legislative Assembly. Bisht represents the Doiwala (Uttarakhand Assembly constituency). Bisht is a member of the Indian National Congress. He has served as the Cabinet minister in the Cabinet of former Chief Minister Shri N. D. Tiwari. With portfolios of transport ,Labour , technical education 

He is currently INTUC president of Uttrakhand

He is founder member of Cricket association of Uttarakhand ,

During his first term as MLA,  He allotted land for Raipur Cricket stadium from Shri veer Bahadur who was chief minister of Uttar Pradesh at that time and completed that project in 2017 during Vijay Bahuguna and Harish Rawat Government in Uttrakhand

Positions held

Elections contested

References

External links
 2007 Election
 2012 Election
 2014 Bye Election

Living people
20th-century Indian politicians
Indian National Congress politicians from Uttarakhand
People from Dehradun district
Year of birth missing (living people)